Yamabe may refer to:

People with the surname 

 Toshiro Yamabe, Japanese go player (山部)(
 Hidehiko Yamabe, Japanese mathematician (山辺)
 Kanae Yamabe, Japanese judoka (山部)

Places 
 Yamabe District, Nara, Japan (山辺)
 Yamabe Station, Hokkaido, Japan (山部)

Japanese-language surnames